The Northumberland Bestiary is an illuminated manuscript bestiary, dating to around 1250-1260 and containing 112 miniature paintings. It may have been produced in northern England - its miniatures are directly inspired by a 1200-1210 bestiary now in the British Library (Royal MS 12 C XIX).

Its first known owner was Robert Turges, a gentleman in Melcombe Regis, Dorset around 1508-1509, as shown on folio 73. It was later owned by Grace Fitzjames (died 1725), also in Dorset. It was inherited by the Dukes of Northumberland (hence its name) and held at Alnwick Castle until being sold at Sotheby's in London on 29 November 1990 for £2.97 million to a private buyer. It was finally acquired by its present owner, the J. Paul Getty Museum, in June 2007.

See also
List of most expensive books and manuscripts

Bibliography
 Eric G. Millar, A Thirteenth-Century Bestiary in the Library of Alnwick Castle, Oxford, Roxburghe Club, 1958
 Cynthia White, From the Ark to the Pulpit. An Edition and Translation of the Transitional Northumberland Bestiary (13th century), Turnhout: Brepols Publishers, 2009
 Cynthia White, The Northumberland Bestiary and the Art of Preaching, Reinardus, vol.18, numéro 1, 2005, p.167-192
 Melanie Holcomb (ed.), Pen and Parchment: Drawing in the Middle Ages, New York, Metropolitan Museum of Art, 2009, 188 p. (lire en ligne [archive]), p. 144-145

External links
 Getty catalogue entry
 Entry on Medieval Bestiary

References

13th-century manuscripts
Illuminated manuscripts of the J. Paul Getty Museum
Bestiaries